The Sulayman Mountain (also known as Sulaiman-Too, Sulayman Rock, or Sulayman Throne) is the only World Heritage Site located entirely in the country of Kyrgyzstan. It is located in the city of Osh and was once a major place of Muslim and pre-Muslim pilgrimage. The rock rises abruptly from the surrounding plains of the Fergana Valley and is a popular place among locals and visitors, with a splendid view.

History
This mountain is thought by some researchers and historians to be the famous landmark of antiquity known as the “Stone Tower”, which Claudius Ptolemy wrote about in his famous treatise Geography.  It marked the midpoint on the ancient Silk Road, the overland trade route taken by caravans between Europe and Asia.

Sulayman Shrine
Sulayman (Solomon) is a prophet in the Qur'an, and the mountain contains a shrine that supposedly marks his grave. Women who ascend to the shrine on top and crawl though an opening across the holy rock will, according to legend, give birth to healthy children. The trees and bushes on the mountain are draped with numerous "prayer flags", small pieces of cloth that are tied to them.

Area protection
According to the UNESCO, the mountain is "the most complete example of a sacred mountain anywhere in Central Asia, worshipped over several millennia". The site is still a popular place for local Muslims, with stairs leading up to the highest peak where there stands a small mosque originally built by Babur in 1510. Much of the mosque was reconstructed in the late 20th century.

The rock also contains the National Historical and Archaeological Museum Complex Sulayman that was built during the Soviet era, showing archaeological findings from the area and its history. The lower slope of the mountain is surrounded by a cemetery.

Notes

References

See also
List of World Heritage Sites in Kyrgyzstan

Osh
Sacred mountains
Mountains of Kyrgyzstan
World Heritage Sites in Kyrgyzstan